Friedrich Reinhold Kreutzwald ( – ) was an Estonian writer who is considered to be the father of the national literature for the country. He is the author of Estonian national epic Kalevipoeg.

Life

Friedrich Reinhold Kreutzwald's parents were serfs at the Jömper estate, Governorate of Estonia, Russian Empire (in present-day Jõepere, Lääne-Viru County). His father Juhan worked as a shoemaker and granary keeper and his mother Anne was a chambermaid. After liberation from serfdom in 1815, the family was able to send their son to school at the Wesenberg (present-day Rakvere) district school.

In 1820, he graduated from secondary school in Dorpat (present-day Tartu, Tartu County, Estonia) and worked as an elementary school teacher. In 1833, Kreutzwald graduated from the Faculty of Medicine at the Imperial University of Dorpat.

Kreutzwald married Marie Elisabeth Saedler on 18 August the same year. From 1833 to 1877, he worked as the municipal physician in Werro (present-day Võru). He was the member of numerous scientific societies in Europe and received honorary doctorates from a number of universities.

Works
Kreutzwald is the author of several moralistic folk books, most of them translated into German: Plague of Wine 1840, The World and Some Things One Can Find in It 1848–49, Reynard the Fox 1850, and Wise Men of Gotham 1857. In addition to these works, he composed the national epic Kalevipoeg (Kalev's Son), using material initially gathered by his friend Friedrich Robert Faehlmann; and wrote many other works based on Estonian folklore, such as Old Estonian Fairy-Tales (1866), collections of verses, and the poem Lembitu (1885), published after his death.

Kreutzwald is considered to be the author of the first original Estonian book. He was one of the leaders of the national awakening, as well as a paragon and encourager of young Estonian-speaking intellectuals.

See also
 Andrew Lang's Fairy Books
 J. R. R. Tolkien
 Kalevala

References

External links
 
 
 

1803 births
1882 deaths
People from Kadrina Parish
People from the Governorate of Estonia
Estonian physicians
Estonian male poets
Epic poets
Collectors of fairy tales
Estonian folk-song collectors
19th-century Estonian painters
19th-century Estonian male artists
19th-century Estonian poets
19th-century male writers
Burials at Raadi cemetery
Physicians from the Russian Empire
19th-century musicologists